Events from the year 1809 in Denmark.

Incumbents
 Monarch – Frederick VI
 Prime minister – Christian Günther von Bernstorff

Events

Undated
 Christoph Ernst Friedrich Weyse, since 1805 organist at Church of Our Lady, has his debut at the Royal Danish Theatre with the singspiel Sovedrikken, and from then on his romances become an important part of the Danish music scene.
 Sporgø Lighthouse is constructed by Poul de Løvenørn.

Births
 7 February – Frederik Paludan-Müller, poet (died 1876)
 18 March – Frederik Ferdinand Helsted, painter and drawing master (died 1875)
 28 April – Oscar O'Neill Oxholm, military officer and landowner (died 1871)
 13 May – Emil Horneman, composer and art and music tradesman (died 1870)

Deaths
 2 April  Joachim-Daniel Preisler, actor (born 1755)
 4 June – Nikolaj Abraham Abildgaard, painter (born 1743)
 17 March – Otto Christopher von Munthe af Morgenstierne, civil servant, judge and landowner (born 1735)
 18 May – Charlotte Elisabeth Henriette Holstein, courtier (born 1741)

Full date missing
 Birgitte Winther, opera singer (born 1751)

References

 
1800s in Denmark
Denmark
Years of the 19th century in Denmark